Below is a complete list of state visits made by Haakon VII of Norway during his reign from 1905 to 1957. Note that the number of state visits is much lower than today as can be seen in the list of state visits made by King Harald V of Norway. Norway was at this time a comparatively poor country and the expenses involved in traveling to other countries in the manner expected by a king, and hosting the customary return visits, were high. In the early years of the independent Norwegian monarchy it was important to affirm the support of the great powers of Europe and state visits were made to the United Kingdom, Germany and France within two years.

List

See also
List of state visits made by Olav V of Norway
List of state visits made by Harald V of Norway

Sources
 Royal House list of state visits

Haakon 07
Haakon VII